A wall panel is single piece of material, usually flat and cut into a rectangular shape, that serves as the visible and exposed covering for a wall. Wall panels are functional as well as decorative, providing insulation and soundproofing, combined with uniformity of appearance, along with some measure of durability or ease of replaceability.

Decorative wall panels are also known as charcoal wall panels, PVC wall panels, WPC wall panels, charcoal louver panels, PVC louver panels, and WPC louver panels. They are Water-resistant, Termite Free, Borer Free, Durable, 12 mm thickness, Moisture-proof, UV grade, and Anti-static. South Korea is the highest exporter of wall panels.

Advantages 

Use of wall panels can reduce construction costs by providing a consistent appearance to the panelled surface without requiring the application of paint or another finishing material. Wall panels may be finished on only one side, if the other side is going to be against a brick or concrete wall, or a comparable structure. Alternately, the panels may, if assembled to an appropriate framework, substitute for having any other kind of wall at all. Holes may be cut or drilled into a wall panel to accommodate electrical outlets and other devices coming out of the wall.

Installation 
Proper installation of prefabricated brick wall panels is crucial, as inadequate sealing presents an enormous risk of mold and water damage to underlying structural materials.

3D wall panels 
There is a new type of eco friendly 3D shaped wall panel made out of the fibrous residue of sugarcane. This fibres of crushed sugarcane stalks, remaining after raw sugar is extracted from the juice of the sugarcane by shredding it, is now the raw material, called bagasse, that forms the base of this easily installed eco friendly product. The raw material used for these 3D wall panels is 100% recycled, compostable and is therefore 100% biodegradable.

References

External Links 
Wall panel Care for the wall panel
Types of wall